William Sanderson Coulthard (December 29, 1923 – December 18, 2005) was a Canadian basketball player who competed in the 1952 Summer Olympics. He was born in Buffalo, New York.

Coulthard was a member of the Tillsonburg Livingstons basketball team which won the Senior Canadian Championships in 1952 and made up the bulk of the 1952 Canadian Olympic basketball team in Helsinki. The Canadian basketball team was eliminated after the group stage in the 1952 tournament. He played all six matches.

In 2013, he was inducted into the Canada Basketball Hall of Fame.

References

External links
Profile
Obituary, Windsor Star, December 20, 2005
Jeff Tribe, "Coulthard 'class' of 2013", Tillsonburg News, May 21, 2013
Jeff Tribe, "Honouring Bill Coulthard", Tillsonburg News, January 13, 2014
Jeff Tribe, "Bill Coulthard in good company", Tillsonburg News, February 25, 2014

1923 births
2005 deaths
American emigrants to Canada
Basketball players at the 1952 Summer Olympics
Canadian men's basketball players
Olympic basketball players of Canada
Basketball players from Buffalo, New York